Bush Creek is a  long 3rd order tributary to the Deep River in Randolph County, North Carolina.

Course
Bush Creek rises in a pond about 0.5 miles southwest of Lineberry in Randolph County, North Carolina and then flows south to join the Deep River in Franklinville, North Carolina.

Watershed
Bush Creek drains  of area, receives about 46.8 in/year of precipitation, and has a wetness index of 387.13 and is about 53% forested.

See also
List of rivers of North Carolina

References

Rivers of North Carolina
Rivers of Randolph County, North Carolina